Is a Woman is the sixth studio album by American rock band Lambchop. Its combination of austere arrangements and minimalist instrumentation marks a transition from former albums' elaborate and lavish sound.

In late 2010 Lambchop performed this album in its entirety, live on stage at a number of venues throughout Europe.

Track listing
All songs written by Kurt Wagner, except "Caterpillar" written by D.C. Book and Kurt Wagner.
 "The Daily Growl"  – 6:36
 "The New Cobweb Summer"  – 6:57
 "My Blue Wave"  – 7:52
 "I Can Hardly Spell My Name"  – 3:24
 "Autumn's Vicar"  – 4:16
 "Flick"  – 5:07
 "Caterpillar"  – 6:19
 "D. Scott Parsley"  – 5:57
 "Bugs"  – 5:43
 "The Old Matchbook Trick"  – 4:41
 "Is a Woman"  – 4:38

Limited edition bonus disc ("Is a Bonus")
 "This Corrosion"   – 6:12
 "Backstreet Girl"   – 4:32
 "Uti" (Kurt Wagner)  – 4:51

Personnel
Allan Lowrey – percussion, drums
Scott Chase – percussion
Tony Crow – piano, acetone, juno, homo machine
Alex McManus – electric guitar, acoustic guitar
Jonathan Marx – juno, sampler
Marky Nevers – space guitar, noise guitar, acetone
William Tyler – acoustic guitar, electric guitar, acetone
Paul Burch jr. – vibes, snare, shaker, brushed snare
Kurt Wagner – vocal, guitar, moog, acetone, casio
Marc Trovillion – bass
Matt Swanson – bass
Paul Niehaus – electric guitar, steel guitar
Rob Stanley – acoustic guitar
Terry Baker – drums, percussion
Tammy Pierce – background vocals
Lisa Crabtree – background vocals
John Delworth – acetone, juno
Deanna Varagona – baritone saxophone
Curtiss Pernice – acoustic guitar

References

2002 albums
Lambchop (band) albums
Merge Records albums